Jack Ashworth (born 3 July 1995) is an English professional rugby league footballer who plays as a  forward for Huddersfield Giants in the Betfred Super League and the England Knights at international level. 

He previously played for St Helens in the Super League, and has spent time on loan from Saints at the Rochdale Hornets in the Championship 1, and the Sheffield Eagles and the Leigh Centurions in the Betfred Championship.

Background
Ashworth was born in Rochdale, Greater Manchester, England. In October 2020 Ashworth appeared in court, where he pled guilty to accusations of punching and damaging a dry wall at his girlfriend's house on Christmas Day 2018. He was also accused of stealing £100 from a Christmas card, to which charge he pled not guilty. Following this court appearance he was remanded on bail, with a trial to follow at Burnley Magistrates' Court in February 2021.

Education
Jack Ashworth attended St Cuthbert's RC Business and Enterprise College in Rochdale from 2006 until 2011. He then went on to do a sports course at Hopwood Hall College Middleton.

Career

St Helens
Ashworth made his Saints début on 6 April 2015 in a Super League match against Hull F.C.

During 2015, Ashworth also played for Rochdale Hornets in the Championship on Dual registration.

In the 2016 season, Ashworth played an outstanding game against Warrington, and made a Man of the Match performance against Hull F.C.

Ashworth joined up with the Sheffield Eagles on Dual registration on 31 January 2018. This is ahead of their first league match against Dewsbury.

He played in the 2019 Challenge Cup Final defeat by Warrington at Wembley Stadium.

He played in the 2019 Super League Grand Final victory over Salford at Old Trafford.

Huddersfield Giants
On 30 November 2020, it was announced that Ashworth had signed a two-year deal with Huddersfield.

Leigh Centurions (loan)
On 11 July 2021, it was reported that he had signed for Leigh in the Super League on season-long loan

In round 17 of the 2021 Super League season, he was sent off for fighting in Leigh's 50-6 loss against Wigan.

International career
In 2019 he was selected for the England Knights against Jamaica at Headingley Rugby Stadium.

References

External links
St Helens profile
SL profile
Saints Heritage Society profile

1995 births
Living people
England Knights national rugby league team players
English rugby league players
Featherstone Rovers players
Halifax R.L.F.C. players
Huddersfield Giants players
Leigh Leopards players
Rochdale Hornets players
Rugby league centres
Rugby league players from Rochdale
Rugby league second-rows
Sheffield Eagles players
St Helens R.F.C. players